Virgularia is a genus of sea pen in the family Virgulariidae.

Species
Virgularia abies Kölliker, 1870
Virgularia agassizi Studer, 1894
Virgularia alba (Nutting, 1912)
Virgularia brochi Kükenthal, 1915
Virgularia bromleyi Kölliker, 1880
Virgularia densa Tixier-Durivault, 1966
Virgularia galapagensis Hickson, 1930
Virgularia glacialis Kölliker, 1870
Virgularia gracilis
Virgularia gracillima Kõlliker, 1880
Virgularia gustaviana (Herklots, 1863)
Virgularia halisceptrum Broch, 1910
Virgularia juncea (Pallas, 1766)
Virgularia kophameli May, 1899
Virgularia loveni Utinomi, 1971
Virgularia mirabilis (Müller, 1776)
Virgularia presbytes Bayer, 1955
Virgularia reinwardti Herklots, 1858
Virgularia rumphi Kölliker, 1870
Virgularia schultzei Kukenthal, 1910
Virgularia tuberculata Marshall, 1883

References

Virgulariidae
Octocorallia genera
Bioluminescent cnidarians